Howard Bretherton (13 February 1890, in Tacoma, Washington – 12 April 1969, in San Diego, California) was an American film director, film editor, and the father of film editor David Bretherton.

Career

He began his career as a propman and then became a film editor during the early 1920s for MGM. He directed his first film, While London Sleeps, in 1926, and thereafter spent more than three decades working mostly as a film director. Of the roughly 100 pictures he directed, most of them were westerns and action/adventure films. The final film he directed was Night Raiders in 1952. Afterwards, he occasionally worked as a director in television through 1958.

Partial filmography

As director

 While London Sleeps (1926)
 The Black Diamond Express (1927)
 The Bush Leaguer (1927)
 One Round Hogan (1927) (lost) 
 Turn Back the Hours (1928)
 Across the Atlantic (1928)
 The Greyhound Limited (1929)
 From Headquarters (1929)  
 The Redeeming Sin (1929)
 The Time, the Place and the Girl (1929)
 The Argyle Case (1929)
 Second Choice (1930)
 Isle of Escape (1930)
 Once Over, Light (1931)
 The Match King (1932) (co-directed with William Keighley)
 Ladies They Talk About (1933) (co-directed with Keighley)
 The Singer of Naples (1935) (co-directed with Moreno Cuyar)
 Dinky (1935) (co-directed with D. Ross Lederman)
 Hop-Along Cassidy (1935)
 Secret Valley (1937)
 It Happened Out West (1937)
 County Fair (1937)
 Star Reporter (1939)
 Undercover Agent (1939)
 Boys' Reformatory (1939)
 Irish Luck (1939)
 Sky Patrol (1939)
 Danger Flight (1939)
 Navy Secrets (1939)
Hidden Enemy (1940)
 Chasing Trouble (1940)
 Laughing at Danger (1940)
 Up in the Air (1940)
 Pirates of the Prairie (1942)
 Rhythm Parade (1942)
 Dawn on the Great Divide (1942)
 Santa Fe Scouts (1943)
 Riders of the Rio Grande (1943)
 Beyond the Last Frontier (1943)
 Whispering Footsteps (1943)
 The San Antonio Kid (1944)
 Law of the Valley (1944)
 The Big Show-Off (1945)
 Gun Smoke (1945)
 The Monster and the Ape (1945)
 Renegades of the Rio Grande (1945)
 Who's Guilty? (1945 serial)
 The Trap (1946)
 Trail of the Mounties (1947)
 The Prince of Thieves (1948)
 Triggerman (1948)
 Night Raiders (1952)

As editor
 One Week of Love (1922)
 Children of Dust (1923)
 Beau Brummel (1924)
 A Self-Made Failure (1924)
 A Successful Calamity (1932)
 Heroes for Sale (1933)
 Baby Face (1933)
 The House on 56th Street (1933)
 Heat Lightning (1934)
 Smarty (1934) (uncredited)

As associate producer
 Identity Unknown (1945)

External links
 

American film directors
American film editors
1890 births
1969 deaths